Penguins of Madagascar: Music from the Motion Picture is the score album for the 2014 film Penguins of Madagascar. The fourth instalment and spin-off of the Madagascar film series, features original score composed by Lorne Balfe, in his first solo debut in a DreamWorks Animation film. He previously wrote additional music for the previous two Madagascar films and also co-composed the score of Megamind (2012) with Hans Zimmer. Zimmer and his music company Remote Control Productions produced the original soundtrack.

The soundtrack album was released digitally on November 21, 2014 and through CDs on December 5, by Relativity Music Group. It featured a special edition bonus track, that consisted the musical score as well as tracks from the extended play, Penguins of Madagascar: Black & White Christmas Album, which featured five holiday songs. Pitbull performed a non-album single titled "Celebrate" for the film, which was played during the credits, and released as a part of his eighth studio album Globalization. A music video of the song was also released on YouTube on October 21, 2014, and the full song released the following day.

Reception 
The score received mixed reviews from critics. James Southall of Movie Wave wrote "anyone who likes this sort of thing will certainly like this because it’s done very well – it’s accomplished music, it’s a great example of how to do essentially monothematic scoring for this type of film in an interesting way (indeed, the score’s weakest moments tend to be when Balfe leaves the theme behind and goes a bit more mickey-mousey) and it certainly has entertainment value." Writing for Global Times, Yang Zhenqi wrote "One aspect that adult audiences are likely to appreciate is the groovy soundtrack composed by Lorne Balfe. The Scottish music producer, whose music credits include popular video games such as Call of Duty: Modern Warfare 2, Assassin's Creed III, and Revelations provides an electrifying score that suits the action perfectly." Entertainment Junkie critic wrote "Penguins of Madagascar is a rewarding and highly enjoyable induction into the Lorne Balfe canon; a canon populated with more accomplished releases than many would care to admit. The repetition of the central thematic concept all throughout the running time will undeniably irritate many of the listeners, but the composer's meticulous attempts to provide variation prove effective."

Writing for The Highlander, Edward Dave wrote "The soundtrack was actually pretty impressive for the simple fact that it made the larger-than-life events in the movie have gravity and weight. It encompasses city music with lots of instrumentation to emphasize the hustle and bustle of the land and tropical sounds which were simpler to set the tone of the island regions. Every musical choice transitioned seamlessly and there were never any parts where the music seemed too overbearing to incorporate comedy or exposition, which many cartoon movies happen to do."

Penguins of Madagascar's score by Lorne Balfe was shortlisted as one of the 114 contenders in the Academy Award for Best Original Score category.

Track listing

Chart performance

Personnel 
Credits adapted from CD liner notes.

 Composer and producer – Lorne Balfe
 Recording – Geoff Foster, Chris Barrett
 Additional recording – Olga Fitzroy, Seth Waldmann
 Programming – Max Aruj
 Mixing – Dennis Sands
 Mastering – Stephen Marsh
 Editing – Slamm Andrews
 Music co-ordinator – Ian Broucek, Meredith McBee
 Music supervisor – Charlene Ann Huang
 Music librarian – Jill Streater
 Score assistance – John Barrett, Laurence Anslow, Stefano Civetta
 Executive producer – Bob Bowen, Jason Markey, Ryan Kavanaugh
 Design – Jordan Butcher
 Orchestra
 Orchestration – Òscar Senén
 Additional orchestration– Joan Martorell
 Orchestra contractor – Lucy Whalley
 Assistant orchestra contractor – Isobel Griffiths
 Orchestra conductor – Gavin Greenaway
 Choir
 Choir – Bratislava Symphony Choir
 Choir conductor – David Hernando Rico
 Instrumentation
 Bass – Allen Walley, Ben Rossell, Lynda Houghton, Mary Scully, Roger Linley, Steve Mair, Steve Rossell
 Bassoon – Gavin McNaughton
 Cello – Adrian Bradbury, Caroline Dearnley, Dave Daniels, Dave Lale, Frank Schaefer, Jonathan Williams, Josephine Knight, Martin Loveday, Nick Cooper, Paul Kegg, Sophie Harris, Anthony Lewis, Vicki Matthews, Will Schofield
 Clarinet – Nick Rodwell
 Drums – Ian Thomas
 Flute – Eliza Marshall, Anna Noakes
 French horn – Laurence Davies, Martin Owen, Nicholas Korth, Nigel Black, Philip Eastop, Richard Berry, Richard Watkins
 Oboe, cor anglais – Rosie Jenkins
 Piano – Dave Arch
 Pipe, whistle – Troy Donockley
 Saxophone:
 Alto – Jamie Talbot, Phil Todd
 Tenor – Jamie Talbot, Ben Castle
 Baritone – Dave Bishop
 Soprano – Phil Todd
 Bass – Mick Foster
 Trombone – Andy Wood, Byron Fulcher, Darren Smith, Dave Stewart, Keith McNicoll, Liam Kirkman, Mark Nightingale, Patrick Jackman, Pete North, Richard Edwards
 Trumpet – Alistair Mackie, Andy Crowley, John Barclay, Mike Lovatt, Simon Gardner, Tom Rees-Roberts
 Tuba – Owen Slade
 Viola – Andy Parker, Bob Smissen, Bruce White, Fiona Bonds, Helen Kamminga, Paul Cassidy, Peter Lale, Steve Wright
 Violin – Boguslaw Kostecki, Cathy Thompson, Chris Tombling, Christina Emanuel, Emil Chakalov, Emlyn Singleton, Everton Nelson, Ian Humphries, Jim McLeod, John Bradbury, Katherine Mayes, Lorraine McAslan, Maciej Rakowski, Mark Berrow, Martin Burgess, Matthew Scrivener, Patrick Kiernan, Perry Montague-Mason, Peter Hanson, Philippa Ibbotson, Rita Manning, Simon Baggs, Steve Morris, Sue Briscoe, Tom Pigott-Smith, Warren Zielinski

Penguins of Madagascar: Black & White Christmas Album 

Penguins of Madagascar: Black & White Christmas Album is the extended play consisting of six holiday songs, performed by the cast members, released by Relativity Music Group on November 24, 2014. The album was also included into the two-disc "special edition" bonus album released on December 5.

Track listing

Release history

References 

2014 soundtrack albums
Madagascar (franchise)